Thoralf Grubbe (20 July 1891 – 6 September 1951) was a Norwegian footballer. He played in one match for the Norway national football team in 1912.

References

External links
 

1891 births
1951 deaths
Norwegian footballers
Norway international footballers
People from Telemark
Association football midfielders
Sportspeople from Vestfold og Telemark